Greenway Parks Historic District is located in Dallas, Texas.

The district was added to the National Register of Historic Places on July 10, 2008.

Photo gallery

See also

National Register of Historic Places listings in Dallas County, Texas

References

External links

National Register of Historic Places in Dallas
Historic districts on the National Register of Historic Places in Texas
Houses on the National Register of Historic Places in Texas